Katiran-e Bala (also Romanized as Katīrān-e Bālā; also known as Katīrān-e ‘Olyā) is a village in Nahr-e Mian Rural District, Zalian District, Shazand County, Markazi Province, Iran. At the 2006 census, its population was 247, in 65 families.

References 

Populated places in Shazand County